The state of Jin was a confederacy of statelets which occupied some portion of the southern Korean peninsula from the 4th to 2nd centuries BCE, bordering the Korean Kingdom of Gojoseon to the north. Its capital was somewhere south of the Han River. It preceded the Samhan confederacies, each of which claimed to be the successor of the Jin state.

Name
"Jin" is the Revised Romanization of Korean , originally written  in Korean Chinese characters (hanja). This was associated with a bearing of 120° (between ESE and SE) but also with the two-hour period between 7 and 9 am, leading it to be associated with dawn and the direction east.

A variant romanization is Chin.

History
The degree of the organization of Jin as a formal political state is unclear. It seems likely that it was a federation of small states much like the subsequent Samhan. For the state to be able to contend with its contemporary Wiman Joseon and send embassies to the court of the Western Han dynasty, there was probably some level of stable central authority. Korean historian Ki-baek Lee (1984, p. 24) also suggests that the kingdom's attempt to open direct contacts "suggests a strong desire on the part of Chin [Jin] to enjoy the benefits of Chinese metal culture." However, for the most part Wiman Joseon prevented direct contact between Jin and China.

King Jun of Gojoseon is reported to have fled to Jin after Wiman seized his throne and established Wiman Joseon. Some believe that Chinese mentions of Gaeguk or Gaemaguk (蓋馬國,literally means Kingdom of armored horses,located near Kaema Plateau) refers to Jin.  Goguryeo is said to have conquered "Gaemaguk" in 26 AD, but this may refer to a different tribe in northern Korea. An official of Gojoseon called Yeok Gye Gyeong(歷谿卿),after failing to persuade Ugeo, is said to have defected from Gojoseon to Jin, which is described to be located at the East of Gojoseon.

Records are somewhat contradictory on Jin's demise: it either became the later Jinhan, or diverged into the Samhan as a whole. Archeological records of Jin have been found centered in territory that later became Mahan.

Language 
Alexander Vovin, among others, suggests that Japonic languages, which he classifies as Peninsular Japonic, were spoken in large parts of southern Korea and Jeju before they were replaced by proto-Koreanic languages. While it is believed that Koreanic/proto-Koreanic and Japonic/proto-Japonic (i.e. Peninsular Japonic) co-existed in the southern Korean Peninsula for an extended period of time, the establishment of Koreanic speakers and their assimilation of Japonic speakers may have played a role in a Yayoi migration to the Japanese archipelago, believed to occurred between 1,000 BC – 300 AD, which overlaps with the period in which Jin is attested. Given this overlap, it is possible that, as Kōno Rokurō and Vovin suggest was the case with the later Korean kingdom of Baekje with regards to Puyŏ languages and Han languages, Jin may have been a bilingual state with regards to Koreanic languages and Peninsular Japonic.

Archeology
Archaeologically, Jin is commonly identified with the Korean bronze dagger culture, which succeeded the Liaoning bronze dagger culture in the late first millennium BCE. The most abundant finds from this culture have been in southwestern Korea's Chungcheong and Jeolla regions. This suggests that Jin was based in the same area, which roughly coincides with the fragmentary historical evidence. 

Artifacts of the culture also show some similarities to the Yayoi people of Kyūshū, Japan.

Legacy
Jin was succeeded by the Samhan: Mahan, Jinhan and Byeonhan. Chinese historical text, Records of the Three Kingdoms says that Jinhan is the successor of the Jin state, while the Book of the Later Han writes that Mahan, Jinhan and Byeonhan were all part of the former Jin state as well as 78 other tribes.

The name of Jin continued to be used in the name of the Jinhan confederacy and in the name "Byeonjin," an alternate term for Byeonhan. In addition, for some time the leader of Mahan continued to call himself the "Jin king," asserting nominal overlordship over all of the Samhan tribes.

See also 
 History of Korea
 Samhan

References

Citations

Bibliography
Lee, C.-k. (1996). The bronze dagger culture of Liaoning province and the Korean peninsula. Korea Journal 36(4), 17-27. 
Lee, K.-b. (1984). A new history of Korea. Tr. by E.W. Wagner & E.J. Schulz, based on the 1979 rev. ed. Seoul: Ilchogak. .

Early Korean history
Former countries in Korean history
4th-century BC establishments
2nd-century BC disestablishments